Scinax pachycrus is a species of frog in the family Hylidae.
It is endemic to Brazil.
Its natural habitats are dry savanna, subtropical or tropical dry shrubland, subtropical or tropical dry lowland grassland, intermittent freshwater marshes, rocky areas, arable land, pastureland, and ponds.
It is threatened by habitat loss.

References

pachycrus
Endemic fauna of Brazil
Amphibians described in 1937
Taxonomy articles created by Polbot